Generala Dorokhova Avenue (also known as Southern relief road for Kutuzovsky Avenue) is an urban highway in Moscow. The highway was opened in October 2020.

Gallery

References 

Streets in Moscow
Roads in Moscow